Back to the Roots is a 1971 double album by John Mayall released on Polydor. Recording sessions took place both in California and London where Mayall invited some former members of his band, notably guitarists Eric Clapton and Mick Taylor. At the end of the 1980s Mayall remixed some tracks and issued them along with some of the older material as Archives to Eighties. An expanded two-CD version of Back to the Roots now includes both the original and later remixed versions of the tracks.

Besides Mayall, who sang and played piano, harmonica and guitar, the musicians who
recorded the original tracks were:
 Eric Clapton, Mick Taylor, Harvey Mandel and Jerry McGee on guitars;
 Larry Taylor and Steven Thompson on bass;
 Keef Hartley and Paul Lagos on drums;
 Don "Sugarcane" Harris on violin;
 Johnny Almond on saxophone and flute.
For Archives to Eighties Mayall recorded new bass and drums tracks played by Bobby Haynes and Joe Yuele.

Track listing 
 All tracks written by John Mayall.

Original LP release 
 Side A
 "Prisons on the Road" – 4:18
 "My Children" – 5:10
 "Accidental Suicide" – 6:17
 "Groupie Girl" – 3:53
 "Blue Fox" (instrumental) – 3:43

 Side B
 "Home Again" – 4:56
 "Television Eye" – 7:32
 "Marriage Madness" – 3:36
 "Looking at Tomorrow" – 6:57

 Side C
 "Dream with Me" – 5:21
 "Full Speed Ahead" – 5:21
 "Mr. Censor Man" – 4:44
 "Force of Nature" – 6:34
 "Boogie Albert" (instrumental) – 2:15

 Side D
 "Goodbye, December" – 5:24
 "Unanswered Questions" – 4:42
 "Devil's Tricks" – 7:45
 "Travelling" – 4:42

2001 2-CD re-release track listing 
 CD 1
 "Prisons on the Road" - 4:18
 "My Children" - 5:10
 "Accidental Suicide" - 6:17
 "Groupie Girl" - 3:54
 "Blue Fox" - 3:43
 "Home Again" - 4:57
 "Television Eye" - 7:32
 "Marriage Madness" - 3:37
 "Looking at Tomorrow" - 6:57
 "Accidental Suicide" (remix) - 6:25
 "Force of Nature" (remix) - 5:34
 "Boogie Albert" (remix) - 2:16
 "Television Eye" (remix) - 6:09
 CD 2
 "Dream with Me" - 5:22
 "Full Speed Ahead" - 5:22
 "Mr Censor Man" - 4:45
 "Force of Nature" - 6:34
 "Boogie Albert" - 2:16
 "Goodbye December" - 5:25
 "Unanswered Questions" - 4:42
 "Devil's Trick" - 7:46
 "Travelling" - 4:43
 "Prisons on the Road" (remix) - 4:20
 "Home Again" (remix) - 4:59
 "Mr Censor Man" (remix) - 4:45
 "Looking at Tomorrow" (remix) - 6:56
Tracks 10, 11, 12 & 13 on each CD are the Archives to Eighties overdubbed versions

All track listings taken from the album's liner notes and sleeves

Charts

Personnel 
 John Mayall – guitar (on A3, B2, B4, C1, D1, D4), harmonica, piano, keyboards, vocals, artwork, illustration, design, photography
 Johnny Almond – bass flute, saxophone, tenor saxophone
 Eric Clapton – guitar (on A1, A3, B1, B4, C4, D1)
 Keef Hartley – drums
 Paul Lagos – drums
 Harvey Mandel – guitar (on A2, A3, A4, B2, C1, C4, D1, D2)
 Jerry McGee – guitar (on A5, D3)
 Larry Taylor – bass
 Mick Taylor – guitar (on A3, B3, C2, C3, C4, D3)
 Steve Thompson – bass (on C2)
 Don "Sugarcane" Harris – violin
 Joe Yuele – drums (on Archives to Eighties)
 Bobby Haynes – bass (on Archives to Eighties)
Technical
Damon Lee-Shaw, John Judnich - engineer
Barrie Wentzell, Dominique Tarlé, Gered Mankowitz, Nancy Throckmorton - photography

References

External links 
 

1971 albums
John Mayall albums
Polydor Records albums
Albums produced by John Mayall
Albums recorded at IBC Studios